Lima is an unincorporated community in Fayette County, Iowa, United States. It is located at the junction of Ivy Road and Heron Road, four miles northeast of Fayette. and within a mile of the abandoned settlement of Albany.

History
 Lima's population was 25 in 1902, and was 32 in 1925.

References

Unincorporated communities in Fayette County, Iowa
Unincorporated communities in Iowa